The Grid is a 2004 television drama serial co-produced by the BBC, Fox TV Studios and Carnival Films. It starred Dylan McDermott and Julianna Margulies. It aired on TNT in the US and on BBC Two in the UK over three consecutive nights and is available on DVD in the UK, United States and Australia. It also aired on Seven HD in Australia in 2007.

Premise
The series follows an international Counter-Terrorism team whose purpose is to combat terrorism; the series focuses on the team's mission to disrupt a terrorist cell bent on destroying the world's economic foundations. The team is assembled following an incident in which a failed Sarin attack in London leaves several terrorists and innocents dead. The team is composed of: Maren Jackson, an administrator for the National Security Council; Max Canary, SAC of the FBI's Joint Terrorism Task Force (JTTF); and Raza Michaels, an expert on Middle Eastern culture who works for the CIA; in addition, the American team works with two British Intelligence agents, senior field agent Derek Jennings of MI5 and mid-level administrator Emily Tuthill of MI6. Maren Jackson must fight to keep the team together, when they are misled by the terrorists and evacuate Manhattan's subways under a false alarm.

Maren had created the team specifically to cut through red tape and encourage inter-agency cooperation, but she is stymied by Acton Sandman, the CIA's Assistant Director for Counter Terrorism, who believes that he should be leader of the team, and the CIA should be in charge of its operation.  To manipulate the situation, Sandman puts political pressure on Raza, and eventually fires him when Raza remains loyal to Maren.

When it becomes evident that there is an imminent threat Maren Jackson and Acton Sandman put their differences aside and work together to prevent the terrorist cell from striking. During the course of the operation Emily Tuthill and Raza Michaels become a couple, and she is distraught when tragedy befalls Raza in Syria when trying to talk down a group of children who had been coerced by the cell leader to martyr themselves. The lives of some of the team are changed forever following the successful operation. Maren Jackson is sworn in as the new National Security Advisor. Emily Tuthill resigns from MI6 after nearly killing Yussef Nasseriah, the terrorist cell leader, following the death of Raza. While Max Canary, Acton Sandman and Derek Jennings returned to work at their various agencies.

Cast

Episodes
The show had 6 episodes however when originally aired on TNT Episodes 1 & 2 aired as one episode as did Episodes 5 & 6. As such they are listed here as one episode.

Home media

Awards and nominations

References

External links
 

Episode list using the default LineColor
BBC television dramas
TNT (American TV network) original programming
2004 British television series debuts
2004 British television series endings
2000s British television miniseries
2004 American television series debuts
2004 American television series endings
2000s American television miniseries
Espionage television series
Television series by 20th Century Fox Television